

Parawa is a locality in the Australian state of South Australia located about  south of the state capital of Adelaide and about  south of the municipal seat in Yankalilla.

Parawa consists of land on the ridge of the Mount Lofty Ranges within the Fleurieu Peninsula.  Range Road (designated route B37), passes through the locality from east to west along the ridgeline.

Parawa which is the Aboriginal name for the headland known as Cape Jervis was approved by the state's Nomenclature Committee in 1948 in respect to section 332 in the cadastral unit of the Hundred of Waitpinga. Boundaries for the locality were created on 5 August 1999 for the "local established name".

The majority of the land use within the locality is "primary production" while some land at its southern boundary has been given protected area status as the Waitpinga Conservation Park.   
 
The 2016 Australian census which was conducted in August 2016 reports that Parawa had 79 people living within its boundaries.

Parawa is located within the federal division of Mayo, the state electoral district of Mawson and the local government area of the District Council of Yankalilla.

Weather station
Parawa has been the site of an official weather station since 1994.

References

Towns in South Australia
Fleurieu Peninsula